Major environmental issues in Bolivia include managing its forests, preserving the country's levels of biodiversity, maintaining ecologically important protected areas, coping with the effects of climate change, and dealing with the environmental consequences of agriculture, mining, oil and gas development, and transportation infrastructure. Bolivia’s history of slash-and-burn agriculture, overgrazing, and industrial pollution has caused significant concern among environmentalists. Soil erosion, made worse by seasonal flooding, and contaminated water supplies are Bolivia’s most pressing environmental problems. The National Service for Protected Areas, established in 1998, currently manages 21 protected areas.

Deforestation 
Bolivia holds an important share of global forest cover. , its primary forest cover was 36.2 million hectares, the 13th largest national area in the world and representing 2.8% of the worldwide total. It is the country with the seventh largest amount of tropical rainforest. Overall, forests made up 51.4 million hectares, 46.8% of the country's total area, in 2013. Both primary forest and overall forest cover have been declining in recent decades. 

Bolivia has 7.7 percent of the Amazon rainforest within its borders.  

Bolivia had a 2018 Forest Landscape Integrity Index mean score of 8.47/10, ranking it 21st globally out of 172 countries.

Annual deforestation averaged 173,994 hectares in net forest lost per year between 1990 and 2000, and 243,120 hectares per year between 2000 and 2010.

References 

Environment of Bolivia